In mathematics, the logarithmic integral function or integral logarithm li(x) is a special function. It is relevant in problems of physics and has number theoretic significance. In particular, according to the prime number theorem, it is a very good approximation to the prime-counting function, which is defined as the number of prime numbers less than or equal to a given value .

Integral representation
The logarithmic integral has an integral representation defined for all positive real numbers  ≠ 1 by the definite integral

Here,  denotes the natural logarithm.

Offset logarithmic integral
The offset logarithmic integral or Eulerian logarithmic integral is defined as

As such, the integral representation has the advantage of avoiding the singularity in the domain of integration.

Equivalently,

Special values
The function li(x) has a single positive zero; it occurs at x ≈ 1.45136 92348 83381 05028 39684 85892 02744 94930... ; this number is known as the Ramanujan–Soldner constant.

−Li(0) = li(2) ≈ 1.045163 780117 492784 844588 889194 613136 522615 578151... 

This is  where  is the incomplete gamma function. It must be understood as the Cauchy principal value of the function.

Series representation
The function li(x) is related to the exponential integral Ei(x) via the equation

which is valid for x > 0. This identity provides a series representation of li(x) as

where γ ≈ 0.57721 56649 01532 ...  is the Euler–Mascheroni constant. A more rapidly convergent series by Ramanujan   is

Asymptotic expansion
The asymptotic behavior for x → ∞ is

where  is the big O notation. The full asymptotic expansion is

or

This gives the following more accurate asymptotic behaviour:

As an asymptotic expansion, this series is not convergent: it is a reasonable approximation only if the series is truncated at a finite number of terms, and only large values of x are employed. This expansion follows directly from the asymptotic expansion for the exponential integral.

This implies e.g. that we can bracket li as:

for all .

Number theoretic significance
The logarithmic integral is important in number theory, appearing in estimates of the number of prime numbers less than a given value. For example, the prime number theorem states that:

Assuming the Riemann hypothesis, we get the even stronger:

In fact, the Riemann hypothesis is equivalent to the statement that:

 for any .

For small ,  but the difference changes sign an infinite number of times as  increases, and the first time this happens is somewhere between 1019 and 1.4×10316.

See also 
 Jørgen Pedersen Gram
 Skewes' number
 List of integrals of logarithmic functions

References 

 

Special hypergeometric functions
Integrals